Boyer Spur is a mountainous spur from the base of Condor Peninsula on the east side of Palmer Land. It was mapped by the United States Geological Survey (USGS) in 1974, and named by the Advisory Committee on Antarctic Names for Stephen J. Boyer, a geologist with the USGS geological and mapping party to the Lassiter Coast area in 1972–73.

References 

Ridges of Palmer Land